Mind's Eye is a 1999 dialogue format novel written by Paul Fleischman. It was named an American Library Association Best Books for Young Adults.

Plot summary
The main character, Courtney, is a very unlucky girl. Her father walked out on her mom and her when she was little. Adding to that, her mom remarried a real jerk. To make matters worse, her mom died leaving Courtney alone with her stepfather. To put the icing on the cake, a riding accident paralyzes her. Finally, to put the cherry on the icing, she is sent to a nursing home. There she meets an old lady named Elva, and another named May, who suffers from Alzheimer's. She repeats what she says three times. For Example: "I think my dance dance dance lessons were cancelled". Elva made a promise to go to Italy to her husband before he died, and since she is too weak to go, she is backed into a corner. She had to take an imaginary trip. She procrastinated and now is unable to do it on her own since she cannot use her eyes to see the maps of Italy. But now, Courtney can help her. They go on a mind's eye trip and finish it. In the end, Elva passes away.

References

1999 American novels
American children's novels
1999 children's books